Alessandro Zanoli (born 3 October 2000) is an Italian professional footballer who plays as a right-back for Serie A club Sampdoria, on loan from Napoli.

Club career 
Zanoli made his Napoli debut on 20 September 2021, replacing Mário Rui after 86 minutes in a 4−0 Serie A away win against Udinese.

Career statistics

References 

Living people
2000 births
Italian footballers
Sportspeople from Carpi, Emilia-Romagna
Association football fullbacks
Serie A players
Serie C players
F.C. Legnago Salus players
S.S.C. Napoli players
U.C. Sampdoria players